The District of Port Edward is a district municipality of approximately 577, located in the Range 5 Coast Land District of British Columbia, Canada. It is situated on the Tsimpsean Peninsula, at Porpoise Harbour, near the southern end of Chatham Sound, close to the mouth of the Skeena River, 15 km (9 mi) southeast of Prince Rupert.

Directions 
Northwest of Port Edward is the City of Prince Rupert, northeast of Port Edward is the City of Terrace, while the cities of Kitimat and Prince George are to the east.

Economy 
At one time sustained by the numerous canneries in the area, transportation and construction are now the mainstays of the local economy. The Port Edward Harbour Authority provides annual moorage for over 2000 vessels annually. Tourism is also important, with the North Pacific Cannery providing both a living museum and national heritage site within Port Edward.

Pembina Pipeline operates a propane rail terminal on Watson Island, moving propane from rail cars to tankers on Porpoise Harbour.

History 
Pacific Northwest LNG (PNW LNG) had been proposed for Lelu Island, adjacent to the townsite of Port Edward. The project was a major joint-venture between Malaysia's state oil and gas company, Petronas, and significant partners including Sinopec and JAPEX. This $11 billion (CAD) project, if constructed, would have brought significant economic activity to Port Edward. The project was cancelled on July 25, 2017.

Demographics 

References

External links 

District municipalities in British Columbia
Populated places in the North Coast Regional District
North Coast of British Columbia
Port cities and towns on the Canadian Pacific coast